Lawn bowls at the 1996 Summer Paralympics consisted of eight events.

Medal table

Participating nations

Medal summary

References 

 

1996 Summer Paralympics events
1996
Paralympics